Machhli Jal Ki Rani Hai is a 2014 Indian Hindi-language horror film directed by Debaloy Dey. The film stars Bhanu Uday, Swara Bhaskar, Murli Sharma and Reema Debnath. It released on 13 June 2014. A sequel to the movie is also on cards.

Plot

The film opens with Ugr Pratap, the spirit master, hot on the trail of an evil spirit possessing the body of a young village girl. He tracks down the spirit but is not able to subdue it and the girl (under the spirit) plunges to her death and curses Ugr Pratap with the annihilation of his family. This horrible curse results in the brutal death of Ugr Pratap's innocent family and Ugr Pratap is accused of murdering them. The well meaning psychiatrist Dr Bharadwaj gets the court to send Ugr Pratap to a quiet psychiatric facility rather than the gallows. Dr Bharadwaj explains that he, too, often encounters paranormal patients who need spiritual rather than psychiatric help and Ugr Pratap is the only person who can help them.

Ayesha and Uday are a happily married couple living in Mumbai. One evening as they are returning from a party they are in a car crash, the other driver is thrown from her vehicle and smashes into their windshield and is killed on the spot. Some weeks later Uday gets a new project to revive a failing factory in Jabalpur (Uday's home town). Uday is excited to meet his old childhood friends and, more important, hopes that the change of place will help Ayesha recover from the shock from the accident.

They arrive in Jabalpur to a warm welcome from Uday's friends and Ayesha spends the next few weeks setting up the home and planning events and visits with friends: happy times. As time goes by strange things happen at the factory, machines inexplicably move and crash and employees are crushed, and at home, the gas range and toasters seem to have a will of their own. Ayesha is also perturbed by their immediate neighbors, the hot headed Manohar and his quietly suffering wife Urmi. The servant woman suggests consulting a local baba (healer and exorcist) who quickly concludes Ayesha is being attacked by an evil spirit. The baba suggests an exorcism but before this can be performed, the spirit, now angry, impales and kills the servant woman (with a deer head bust) and the baba. Around this time Ayesha's father hears about these strange events and quickly finds Ugr Pratap and sets off for Jabalpur.

Uday dismisses all the spirit theories and consults a doctor. Uday brings Ayesha to the factory hoping it will take her mind off the events. (Ayesha leaves their child, Sunny, with Urmi.) Ayesha notices that Uday's office has an old photograph of the factory manager and staff and among them are Manohar and Urmi. It is revealed that Manohar was the factory manager some sixty years ago and is now dead! Ayesha rushes back home in horror and runs into Urmi's house. It is uninhabited and dilapidated! Ayesha finds an old newspaper clipping which explains how Manohar was caught embezzling and was dismissed and arrested. Unable to bear this great dishonor, he poisoned his wife and child and himself. As this horrific truth dawns on Ayesha the spirits of Manohar and Urmi and their daughter show themselves. The spirit of Manohar bitterly says it will never let the factory carry on. And with that the three spirits possess Ayesha completely.

Ayesha returns home and now launches her reign of terror on the other servants. Her father and Ugr Pratap arrive just as Ayesha attacks Uday himself. Ugr Pratap fights back with his spiritual kamandal. There is a long battle as the spirit flees to the river bank and repeatedly attacks Ugr Pratap. Uday finally plunges the charmed trisul (trident) into Ayesha and dispatches all the spirits to the other worlds. The film ends as Uday and Ayesha return home and find their son nearly drowned but unhurt. Ugr Pratap vows to continue fighting evil in the world.

Cast
Bhanu Uday as Uday Saxena
Swara Bhaskar as Ayesha Saxena
Murli Sharma as Manohar Gupta
Reema Debnath as Urmi
Sakha Kalyani as Mangla
Deepraj Rana as Ugra Pratap Singh
Saurabh Dubey as Dr, Akhilesh Trivedi
Avinash Mukkanawar as Dr. Indraneel Mukharjee
Saandesh B Nayak as Iliyaas Afsar
Abhinav Jain as Inspector
Binny Sharma as item number

Soundtrack

See also
 List of Bollywood horror films

References

External links 
 
 

2014 horror films
2010s Hindi-language films
Indian horror films